William Alexander Erskine West-Erskine , M.A., (12 September 1839 – 25 October 1892) was a politician in South Australia.

West-Erskine was the eldest son of Rev. William James West, M.A., Rector of Delgany, Ireland, by his marriage with Elmina, eldest surviving daughter and co-heir of Alexander Erskine, of Bulhall, county Forfar, and Longhaven, county Aberdeen, was born at Annamoe, County Wicklow, Ireland, and was educated at Christ Church, Oxford. Having emigrated to South Australia, he was member for Mount Barker in the South Australian House of Assembly from 1872 to 1875, including eight months as Commissioner of Public Works in the Boucaut Government from June 1875 to February 1876.

He attended the Centennial Exposition in Philadelphia, United States as a commissioner for South Australia in 1876.

Following his return to South Australia he was elected as member for Encounter Bay from 1878 to 1881.  West-Erskine was elected to the South Australian Legislative Council  in May 1885, but retired in 1891, when he returned to England. In 1872 he assumed the name of Erskine, by royal licence, in addition to his patronymic.

He was a member of the council of the University of Adelaide from its inception in 1874 until he left the colony in 1891.

West-Erskine never married and died in England on 25 October 1892.

References

 
|-

|-

1839 births
1892 deaths
Members of the South Australian House of Assembly
Members of the South Australian Legislative Council
People from County Wicklow
Irish emigrants to Australia
19th-century Australian politicians